The three lands of Denmark historically formed the Danish kingdom from its unification and consolidation in the 10th century:

Zealand (Sjælland) and the islands south of it, with Roskilde as a centre
Jutland (Jylland), the western peninsula, and the island of Fyn, with Viborg as a centre.
Scania (Skåneland) on the Scandinavian peninsula, with Lund as a centre

Each of the lands retained their own thing (ting) and statute laws until late medieval time (Jutlandic Law, Zealandic Law and Scanian Law). Although Denmark was a unified kingdom, the custom of rendering homage to the King at the three individual assemblies remained. A remnant is the current division of Denmark into two High Court districts, the Eastern and Western High Court.

During the early 19th century, Zealand and Fyn became administratively united as Østifterne with a provincial assembly in Roskilde. Jutland, The Islands and Bornholm remains an informal subdivision still used, notably in meteorology and public statistics. Bornholm is the only part to represent Scania after the rest of the region was lost to Sweden in 1658.  (Bornholm was also lost in 1658, but was recovered two years later.)

In recent decades, the less specific division between Eastern and Western Denmark has also become common, for example when describing logistic, economic and political patterns. Funen may be attributed to both the eastern and western part of the country, the border line being either the Great Belt or the Little Belt.

See also
Traditional districts of Denmark
Subdivisions of Denmark
Lands of Sweden
Regions of Norway

Denmark
Former subdivisions of Denmark
Former states and territories of Denmark
Medieval Denmark